Viktor Didukh (born 23 January 1987) is a Ukrainian male para table tennis player competing at singles (class 8) and team events (class 6–8). Along with Maksym Nikolenko, he won a gold medal at the 2016 Summer Paralympics in Rio de Janeiro, defeating the Swedish team of Linus Karlsson and Emil Andersson at the men's team class 6-8 finals. Didukh also won a silver medal at the 2020 Summer Paralympics, having lost to Zhao Shuai in the men's class 8 final.

References 

1987 births
Living people
Sportspeople from Lviv
Paralympic table tennis players of Ukraine
Ukrainian male table tennis players
Medalists at the 2016 Summer Paralympics
Medalists at the 2020 Summer Paralympics
Paralympic gold medalists for Ukraine
Paralympic silver medalists for Ukraine
Paralympic medalists in table tennis
Table tennis players at the 2016 Summer Paralympics
Table tennis players at the 2020 Summer Paralympics
21st-century Ukrainian people